Miesenbach is a municipality in the district of Wiener Neustadt-Land in the Austrian state of Lower Austria, near the mountain ridge of the Dürre Wand.

Population

'

Notable residents
 Friedrich Gauermann (1807–1862), Biedermeier painter
  (1909–2001), local historian and dialect scholar
  (* 1957), politician (ÖVP)

References 

Cities and towns in Wiener Neustadt-Land District